Elisabeth Käser (born 9 March 1951) is a former Swiss slalom canoeist who competed in the 1970s.

She won three medals in the K-1 team event at the ICF Canoe Slalom World Championships with two golds (1975, 1977) and a silver (1973).

She also finished 20th in the K-1 event at the 1972 Summer Olympics in Munich.

References

1951 births
Canoeists at the 1972 Summer Olympics
Living people
Olympic canoeists of Switzerland
Swiss female canoeists
Medalists at the ICF Canoe Slalom World Championships